Orenburg Regional Museum of Fine Arts is an art museum located in Orenburg, Russia. It was opened to the public in 1961. The gallery houses a collection of Soviet, Russian, and Western European art, and was initially predicated on a collection of Lukian Popov works.

References

Art museums established in 1961
Art museums and galleries in Russia
Buildings and structures in Orenburg
Tourist attractions in Orenburg Oblast
Culture of Orenburg Oblast
Cultural heritage monuments in Orenburg
Objects of cultural heritage of Russia of regional significance